John F. Link Sr. (March 22, 1901 – April 8, 1968) was an American film editor from the 1930s through the 1960s. Born in Alabama on March 22, 1901, he began editing in 1930.  He began editing film shorts, and from 1930 to 1932 he edited almost 20. Link was given his first opportunity to edit a feature film in 1932, with Carnival Boat, directed by Albert Rogell, and starring Bill Boyd and Ginger Rogers. In his 30-year career, he would edit over 30 films, with the highlight of his career would be the 1943 classic, For Whom the Bell Tolls, starring Gary Cooper and Ingrid Bergman.  Link, along with co-editor Sherman Todd, received an Academy Award nomination for their work on this film.

His son, John F. Link Jr., is also a film editor, and was also nominated for an Academy Award: for the 1988 film, Die Hard. Due to the similarity in their names, it is unclear as to when Link Sr. retired.  The American Film Institute has combined both the father and son's career under one listing. The Internet Movie Database (imdb) has Link Sr.'s final film as 1958's, The Immoral Mr. Teas, directed by Russ Meyer, however Link Sr. was most likely, due to the dating of the films, also the editor on three additional films, 1961's The Sergeant Was a Lady, the 1962 film The Shame of the Sabine Women, and The Desert Raven in 1965. Link also directed two films, Devil's Cargo in 1948, and Call of the Forest in 1949.

Link Sr. died on April 8, 1968, in Los Angeles, California, at the age of 67.

Filmography

(Per AFI database)

 Carnival Boat  (1932)
 Song of the Eagle, (assistant editor)  (1933)
 Forlorn River  (1937)
 Born to the West  (1937)
 Thunder Trail  (1937)
 Geronimo  (1939)
 For Whom the Bell Tolls  (1943)
 I'm from Arkansas  (1944)
 Knickerbocker Holiday  (1944)
 Up in Arms  (1944)
 Are These Our Parents  (1944)
 Black Magic  (1944)
 Bowery Champs  (1944)
 Anoush  (1945)
 Identity Unknown  (1945)
 Jealousy  (1945)
 The Woman Who Came Back  (1945)
 The Glass Alibi  (1946)
 Strange Impersonation  (1946)
 The Pretender  (1947)
 Queen of the Amazons  (1947)
 Yankee Fakir  (1947)
 Devil's Cargo, director  (1948)
 The Vicious Circle  (1948)
 Call of the Forest, director  (1949)
 Gold Fever (1952)
 Stormy, the Thoroughbred with an Inferiority Complex  (1954)	
 Space Master X-7  (1958)
 Escape from Red Rock  (1958)
 The Sergeant Was a Lady  (1961)
 The Shame of the Sabine Women  (1962)
 The Desert Raven  (1965)

References

1901 births
1968 deaths
American film editors